Merih Karaaslan (1949 - 3 January 2002) was a Turkish architect.

Biography
Graduated from Istanbul Technical University in 1972. 
Between the years 1972-2002 has been working freelance architecture .
He worked in various educational institutions as a part-time lecturer between the years of 1972-1980.
He worked as editor in the magazine 'Mimarlık' between the years 1985-1994
He worked as Secretary-general of the Chamber of Architects from 1992 to 1994
He was one of the founder members of Freelance Architects Association.
He participated in architectural competitions, including first prize of seventeen, took over ninety awards and honorable mentions, almost fifteen competition had served as a jury member.
He won the 'Best Project' award with the 'Ankara Terasevler Project' in 2nd National Architecture Exhibition Site Project in 1990.
He won the 'Best Building' award with the Cappadocia Peri Tower Hotel building in the 5th National Architecture Exhibition in 1996.

Architecture 
The different elements of various periods in history referred to by placing the different axes on the production and use of color is an attractive structure with the creation of the interest method, has been used frequently in the next products by the Karaaslan. Even as their own architectural identity that is declared in Karaaslan.

Karaaslan as an "image production" architecture. Ensuring that, as a result, the structure of the image which is sufficient. Even if the structure of the detail and workmanship problems image ignores the Karaaslan. "If in our country and the models of the designer's Particular production process monitoring when we found it, ignored the fine workmanship, a special detail and special materials are required to adopt a design that does not require it." the lyrics are this understanding.

See how your unwillingness repays the detail and workmanship which, in contrast to Karaaslan inner and outer space showed that the sensitivity is extremely important. Although a part of the city, and the relationship with the city of Karaaslan to communicate. This reflects the export structure for interior/exterior makes continuous with the urban exterior spaces to produce the special.

Participating in her Town Hall square and the structure beneath the ALTINDAĞ entries defines space; ANDAŞ wide eaves in the Bazaar; Ostim Bazaar-office blocks, the block at the bottom of the exterior; ÇORUM cultural and Trade Center are examples of successful entry in the quest for this outdoor space. The importance of this special exterior and interior space, the Karaaslan  displayed. Afyon City Bazaar ', Arinna Hotel/Side, Government House and the. Setup are examples of this attitude of the original interiors of the hotel Nevsehir. The importance of the external environment of the Interior of the structure, Karaaslan, especially the input options and looking for reference system and language of the indoors outdoors.

In Ankara, TERASEVLER  site is merging inner and outer space be perceived as. There is also a garden space encircled by buildings, interiors and Interior has been converted, it is enriched with the fragmentation and enveloped the mass we initiated. The richness of color participated in the system as an element which skillfully.

Karaaslan's design caught the other venues on a form and that the method is applied frequently and other studies. Contests are often used during the trial.
Karaaslan has decided very quickly, within a few days the landing was a design's contribution to this approach. When it comes to a subject in front of a business, most of the time, memory, and from there to refer to certain patterns of Karaaslan, forms and uses. The Pavilion at Expo ' 92 in Turkey is captured in the form/image transformed in structure, and then ANDAŞ Bazaar in another market again. Government House of ALİAĞA in the Government House and the texture on the ZONGULDAK  Office of the municipal Building block, for example Hotel Altindag's façade in the apartment, on the ground, and many cubic fragmentation Terasevler buildings is made of blocks of many public housing have been used  frequently on your buildings.

Since the earliest days of his life, the architecture profession, Karaaslan  organizations demonstrated in a special part of your personality, fighting and architecture environment is very valuable to you. If Western countries (except for any country, even Turkey) had lived, will be able to access a much wider audience capacity with Karaaslan has, of course, human personality and its products.

Works and awards

 Altındag City Hall and Environmental Planning, 1st Prize, in 1986 Altındağ Town Hall
 İzmir Aliaga Government Office Architectural Project Competition, 1st. Prize, in 1983.ALIAGA GOVERNMENT OFFICE
 İzmir International Cultural Park and Fairground, Project Competition, 1st. Prize, in 1990.
 (1986) Afyon City Bazaar (with N.Karaaslan)AFYON CITY BAZAAR
 (1987) Side, Hotel Arinna (with N.Karaaslan) 
 (1989) Kayseri Financial Office (with İ.Aksu)
 (1991) Sefik Gul Villa VILLA SEFIK GUL
 (1994) Ankara Yamacevler (with İ.Aksu)YAMACEVLER in Ankara
 (1993) Urfa Balıklıgol and surrounding and City Center (Competition, 1st.Prize).BALIKLIGOL in URFA
 National Architecture Awards, Construction Branch -Merit Pay, (Peritower Hotel, in 1996)PERI TOWER HOTEL
 National Architecture Awards, Architectural Project Branch - Merit Pay, (Terasevler, in 1990).TERASEVLER in ANKARA
 National Architecture Awards, Construction Branch "Living Environment", Merit Pay, in 1998.

Books 
Konutlar Villalar / Toplukonut ve Siteler / Yenileme Çalışmaları Yapı'dan Seçmeler 1 (1999)

References 

1949 births
Turkish architects
2002 deaths
Istanbul Technical University alumni